Jon Latimer Ginoli (born  in Peoria, Illinois) is an American guitarist.  He is best known as a member of the band Pansy Division, which was founded by Ginoli and Chris Freeman in 1991.  Pansy Division is known as one of the founding examples of the queercore genre of punk rock. He is openly gay.

Ginoli, with Pansy Division, was featured in the 1997 documentary film Queercore: A Punk-U-Mentary by Scott Treleaven; as an actor, in the 2002 comedy short Going West by Michael Mew;  and in the 2008 film Pansy Division: Life in a Gay Rock Band by Michael Carmona.

Prior to Pansy Division, Ginoli was a singer, songwriter and guitarist for an indie band called The Outnumbered, which he formed while an undergraduate at the University of Illinois at Urbana-Champaign. While in college, Ginoli served a short stint as a DJ at Urbana radio station WPGU.

Ginoli is a 1978 graduate of Richwoods High School. In 1977 he created his own rock and roll fanzine, Hoopla.

References

External links
 The Official Pansy Division Website

1959 births
American punk rock guitarists
LGBT people from Illinois
Living people
Musicians from Peoria, Illinois
Queercore musicians
American gay musicians
Guitarists from Illinois
American male guitarists
20th-century American guitarists
20th-century American male musicians
American LGBT singers
20th-century LGBT people
21st-century LGBT people